Guilford High School may refer to:

Guilford High School (Connecticut)
Guilford High School (Illinois), in Rockford
Guilford School building in Cincinnati, Ohio

See also
Gilford High School, New Hampshire
Guildford High School, Surrey, England
Southwest Guilford High School, High Point, North Carolina